Anderson Correia may refer to:

 Anderson Correia (footballer) (born 1991), Brazilian footballer
 Anderson Correia (basketball) (born 1997), Cape Verdean basketball player